Stephen Murray Langdon (born December 23, 1953) is a Canadian former professional ice hockey left winger. He played seven regular-season National Hockey League games with the Boston Bruins between 1975 and 1977, recording one assist. He also appeared in four games with the Bruins during the 1976 NHL playoffs. The rest of his career, which lasted from 1973 to 1979, was spent in different minor leagues.

Early life 
Langdon was born in Toronto, Ontario. As a youth, he played in the 1966 Quebec International Pee-Wee Hockey Tournament with the Toronto Shopsy's minor ice hockey team.

Career 
Langdon was drafted in the fourth round, 63rd overall, of the 1973 NHL Amateur Draft by the Bruins. Langdon was also drafted by the Minnesota Fighting Saints in the 1973 WHA Amateur Draft; however, he never played in the World Hockey Association. He later coached his son's youth hockey team in the Rochester Youth Hockey House program.

Career statistics

Regular season and playoffs

References

External links
 

1953 births
Living people
Albuquerque Six-Guns players
Boston Bruins draft picks
Boston Bruins players
Broome Dusters players
Canadian ice hockey right wingers
London Knights players
Minnesota Fighting Saints draft picks
Rochester Americans players
Ice hockey people from Toronto
Toronto Marlboros players